Cicortonide is a synthetic glucocorticoid corticosteroid which was never marketed.

References

Acetate esters
Acetonides
Secondary alcohols
Corticosteroid cyclic ketals
Diketones
Fluoroarenes
Glucocorticoids
Nitriles
Organochlorides
Pregnanes